Beil is a German surname. Notable people with the surname include:

Caroline Beil (born 1966), German actress
Charles Beil (1894–1976), Canadian sculptor
Gerhard Beil (1926–2010), German politician
Jessica Biel (born 1982), American actress
Larry Beil, American sportscaster
Larry Beil (American football) (1923–1986), American football player

German-language surnames